Raja Bijoy Giri was the 15th Chakma Raja of the Chakma Circle.

Personal life

He was the son of 14th Chakma Raja Sambuddha and was made Yuvaraj (Crown Prince) in his adolescence. He had a younger brother the Prince Udai Giri.

History

The Chakma Circle and its people lived in "Rohang" or "Roang" present day Rakhine State (previously known as Arakan).

He lived during 7th centuries CE.

When he was Yuvaraj (Crown Prince) he crossed the River Tewa and travelled six days by water with seven chamus or 26,000 troops into a place called Kalabagha and captured three countries - Teknaf, Indang Hills and Krindang Hills.

Senapati General Radha Mohan Khisa the Commander in Chief of the Chakma National Army led the army to victory in the battlefield himself.

After their military success they received news that Raja Sambuddha had died and Prince Udai Giri had usurped the throne.

Bijoy Giri decided to remain in the conquered territories in order to avoid a fratricidal conflict if he returned home and also instructed his troops and following to follow suit.

Majority of the army remained as they were loyal to him and took local "Ari" (Arakanese or Rakhine) women as wives.

It may be argued that the Tanchangya Chakma people and Daingnet Chakma people are descendants of Udai Giri and the older part of the Chakma Kingdom whose capital was known as Champaknagar.

Debate

There are debating between Reang and Chakmas about Bijoygiri.

According to reang people, Bijoygiri was the great commander of Manikya Dynasty who fought against Kuki Kingdom and won the battle. Bijoygiri was Reang.

According to Chakma, Bijoygiri was the son of Chakma Chief Sambuddha

References 

"A new chapter of Chakma history started with Sambuddha’s eldest son, Bijoygiri (15th), who journeyed for six days by water, with a large army, up to a place called Kalabgha, on the banks of the river Tewa, and by his efforts, and that of his general, conquered a new territory. The account goes, “He received news that his father had died and his younger brother, Udaigiri (14th ), had usurped the throne. At this news he remained in the new territory. But he left no descendant."
- Raja Bhuvan Mohan Roy the 48th Chakma Raja, The Chittagong Hill Tracts District Gazetteer

External links
 Royal Chakma Kingdom - Buddhist Times

Chakma Royal Family
Chakma people
Bangladeshi Buddhists